Martyna Wiankowska (born 24 December 1996) is a Polish footballer who plays as a defender who plays for 1. FFC Turbine Potsdam and has appeared for the Poland women's national team.

Career
Wiankowska has been capped for the Poland national team, appearing for the team during the 2019 FIFA Women's World Cup qualifying cycle.

International goals

References

External links
 
 
 

1996 births
Living people
Polish women's footballers
Women's association football defenders
KKS Czarni Sosnowiec players
1. FFC Turbine Potsdam players
Poland women's international footballers
Polish expatriate footballers
Polish expatriate sportspeople in Germany
Expatriate women's footballers in Germany